Brenthia anisopa is a species of moth of the family Choreutidae. It was described by Alexey Diakonoff in 1968. It is found on Luzon island in the Philippines.

References

Brenthia
Moths described in 1968